G. Tyler Miller (July 25, 1902 – July 24, 1988) was the third President of James Madison University, serving from 1945 to 1971. Miller Hall on the JMU campus is named for him. He was an environmental science textbook writer.

References 

Presidents of James Madison University
1988 deaths
1902 births
20th-century American academics